Habrosyne aurorina is a moth in the family Drepanidae. It is found in Japan and Korea.

References

Thyatirinae
Moths described in 1881